The 2021 Per sempre Alfredo was the 1st edition of the Per sempre Alfredo road cycling one day race, which was held on 21 March 2021, starting in the city of Florence and finishing in Alfredo Martini's home town of Sesto Fiorentino.

The race was won in a sprint by Matteo Moschetti ahead of Mikel Aristi and Samuele Zambelli (Italy).

Teams 
Two UCI WorldTeams, seven UCI ProTeams, ten UCI Continental teams, and the Italian national team made up the twenty teams that participated in the race. All teams entered seven riders each, for a total of 140 riders, of which 113 finished.

UCI WorldTeams

 
 

UCI ProTeams

 
 
 
 
 
 
 

UCI Continental Teams

 
 
 
 
 
 
 
 
 
 

National Teams

 Italy

Result

References 

Per sempre Alfredo
Per sempre Alfredo
Per sempre Alfredo